José María Argoitia Acha (born 18 January 1940) is a Spanish retired footballer who played as a forward.

Football career
Born in Galdakao, Biscay, Argoitia joined Athletic Bilbao in 1960, from Basque neighbours CD Basconia. He made his La Liga debut on 2 October in a 1–3 away loss against Sevilla FC, and spent a total of 12 seasons with the club, appearing in 308 official games and scoring 70 goals.

Argoitia's best input with the Lions came in the 1966–67 campaign, when he netted 11 times in 22 appearances to help his team to the seventh position. He retired in 1973 at the age of 33, after splitting 1972–73 with Sestao Sport Club in the lower leagues and Racing de Santander in Segunda División.

Argoitia popularized a dribble move known as the Diabolo.

While playing for Athletic Bilbao, Argoitia scored a highly-controversial goal, known as the telegol, against UD Las Palmas during the 1970–71 La Liga season. At the second-half restart, Argoitia immediately ran towards the opponent's end of the field where he left the field near their goalpost. After a teammate sent the ball into Las Palmas' goal area, and the goalkeeper was unable to collect it, Las Palmas defender Martín Marrero attempted to clear the ball. However, at this point, Argoitia re-entered the field and snatched the ball into the net for the only goal of the match. Las Palmas protested the goal, believing it was a violation of the offside rule, and ultimately the International Football Association Board added a clarification which prohibited an attacking player from leaving the field of play without the referee's permission to avoid violating the offside rule.

Honours
Copa del Generalísimo: 1969

References

External links

1940 births
Living people
Spanish footballers
Footballers from the Basque Country (autonomous community)
Association football forwards
La Liga players
Segunda División players
CD Basconia footballers
Athletic Bilbao footballers
SD Indautxu footballers
Sestao Sport Club footballers
Racing de Santander players